Radiopark (also known as South African Broadcasting Corporation Building, simply SABC Building) is a skyscraper in Auckland Park, Johannesburg, South Africa. It is thirty  stories tall and is the headquarters of the South African Broadcasting Corporation.

See also
 List of tallest buildings in South Africa

References

Skyscraper office buildings in Johannesburg